The HART Sapphire Series is a state netball league featuring teams from Queensland. The league is organised by Netball Queensland. The current semi-professional league was first played for during the 2019 season. It replaced earlier state leagues organised by Netball Queensland as the top level netball competition in Queensland. On a national level, the HART Sapphire Series is effectively a third level league. Reserve teams compete the Ruby Series. Queensland Sapphires are the representative team of the HART Sapphire Series. They originally played as Queensland Fusion. In 2021 they were re-branded Queensland Sapphires after the HART Sapphire Series.

History

Earlier state leagues
Between 2001 and 2018, Netball Queensland organised a series of state leagues. These included the Dairy Farmers Cup, the Holden Astra Cup, the Holden Cruze Cup, the Queensland Champions Cup and the Queensland State Netball League.

2019
In 2019 the founding members of the HART Sapphire Series included Bond University Bull Sharks, Brisbane North Cougars, Carina Leagues Club Tigers, Ipswich Jets, Moreton Bay/USC Thunder, Northern Rays and QUT Wildcats. The inaugural season began on 25 June 2019, with a match which saw Thunder defeat Bull Sharks 53–44. QUT Wildcats were the inaugural premiers after defeating Cougars 60–49 in the grand final.

2020
Due to the COVID-19 pandemic, the 2020 season took place later then planned. Northern Rays were unable to compete due to travel restrictions, so the second season went ahead with six teams in the Sapphire Series. Cougars, Jets, Wildcats, Tigers, Bullsharks and Thunder also entered the Ruby Series were they joined by a seventh team, Darling Downs Panthers. Cougars finished the season as premiers after defeating Jets 62–47 in the grand final.

2021
The 2021 Sapphire Series featured eight teams with the return of Northern Rays and the debut of QUT Netball. Brisbane North Cougars finished the season as premiers after defeating QUT Netball 70–45 in the grand final.

2022
In December 2021 it was announced that Gold Coast Titans would enter a team in the 2022 Sapphire Series.

Teams

Notes
  Brisbane South Wildcats were originally partnered with Queensland University of Technology and were known as QUT Wildcats.
  Darling Downs Panthers only play in the Ruby Series.
  Gold Coast Titans are the netball team of Gold Coast Titans
  USC Thunder were originally known as Moreton Bay Thunder. They are partnered with both the University of the Sunshine Coast and Sunshine Coast Lightning. 
  USQ Jets Netball Club were originally known as Ipswich Jets. They are partnered with both the University of Southern Queensland and Ipswich Jets.

Venues
The majority of HART Sapphire Series matches are played at the Queensland State Netball Centre. Northern Rays play their home games in North Queensland, while the remaining teams can play two home games in their own venue each season.

Representative team
Queensland Sapphires are the representative team of the HART Sapphire Series. They originally played as Queensland Fusion. In 2021 they were re-branded Queensland Sapphires after the HART Sapphire Series.

Division 1 grand finals
Dairy Farmers Cup

Holden Astra Cup

Holden Cruze Cup

Queensland Champions Cup

Mission Queensland State Netball League Division 1

HART Sapphire Series

Awards
Katie Walker Medal
The HART Sapphire Series MVP award is named after Katie Walker.

HART Sapphire Series Grand Final MVP

Ruby Series

Grand finals

Awards
Ruby Series Season MVP

Ruby Series Grand Final MVP

Main sponsors

References

External links
   HART Sapphire Series on Facebook

   
Netball in Queensland
Netball leagues in Australia
Queensland Sapphires
Sports competitions in Queensland
2019 establishments in Australia
Sports leagues established in 2019